Karl Wilhelm de Hamilton, also Carl Wilhelm de Hamilton, Charles William de Hamilton, or Karel-William Von Hamilton (1668 in Brussels – 23 February 1754 in Augsburg) was a painter born at the end of the Dutch Golden Age. He is best known for his ‘forest-floor’ still life landscapes, game piece still life paintings, and bird paintings.

Biography
Karl Wilhelm de Hamilton was one of a large family of artists active in the late 17th and early 18th centuries. He was the son and pupil of Scottish still life painter James de Hamilton (c.1640-1720), who settled and worked in Brussels. His brothers Philipp Ferdinand (c.1664-1750) and Johann Georg (1672-1737) were both active in Vienna, while Karl Wilhelm worked mainly in Germany, first in Baden-Baden and later in Augsburg, where he served as valet and court painter to Bishop Alexander Sigismund von der Pfalz-Neuburg.

He was a teacher of painters Josef Franz Adolph, Johann Elias Ridinger and Johann Jakob Schalch.

Works
Among his most famous works are several variations on a landscape known as The Parliament of Birds, based on a poem by Geoffrey Chaucer written around 1380.

Collections 

The following collections contain work(s) by Karl Wilhelm de Hamilton:

 Fitzwilliam Museum (Cambridge, England)
 Wallraf-Richartz Museum (Cologne, Germany)
 Musée des Beaux-Arts (Dijon, France)
 Staatliche Kunsthalle (Karlsruhe, Germany)
 Musée des Beaux-Arts (Lyon, France)
 Staatsgalerie (Stuttgart, Germany)
 Finnish National Gallery (Helsinki, Finland)

References

External links

 RKD – Netherlands Institute for Art History database entry

1668 births
1754 deaths
Dutch male painters
Dutch still life painters
Still life painters
Bird artists
People from Brussels